Straber Ford Bridge, also known as Ripley County Bridge #173, is a historic stone arch bridge located in Center Township, Ripley County, Indiana, United States.  It was built in 1908, and is a four-span, semicircular-arch bridge constructed of limestone.  It measures 105 feet, 8 inches, long and is 20 feet wide.

It was added to the National Register of Historic Places in 2009.

References

Road bridges on the National Register of Historic Places in Indiana
Bridges completed in 1908
Transportation buildings and structures in Ripley County, Indiana
National Register of Historic Places in Ripley County, Indiana
1908 establishments in Indiana
Stone arch bridges in the United States